The Calanda Broncos are an American football team from Landquart, Switzerland. The club, formed in 1991 as the Landquart Broncos, changed its name in late 2008 after the Calanda mountain to show the club's desire to represent a larger region of Graubünden then just the community of Landquart. With the move to the stadium in nearby Chur the club was also able to draw larger crowds for its home matches. The club is the best-supported American football club in Switzerland.

The club plays at the highest level of American football in Switzerland, the Nationalliga A, and has won the national championship game, the Swiss Bowl, on eleven occasions, last in 2021.

History
The club was formed as the Landquart Broncos in 1991. Originally, the club opted for the name Grison Broncos, Grison being the English name for Graubünden, but this was vetoed by the Swiss American Football Association. After a slow start with 13 consecutive defeats the Broncos won their first game in 1993, followed by promotion to the Nationalliga A, the highest level of American football in Switzerland.

The Broncos took another three seasons to make their first Swiss Bowl appearance, narrowly losing 14–13 to the Seaside Vipers St. Gallen in 1998. The team faced St. Gallen once more in the Swiss Bowl in 1999 but again lost, this time 16–7. The club came close to financial collapse after this, dropping down to the second tier but making a quick return to Nationalliga A by 2002.

The 2003 season saw the club narrowly reach the play-offs with a 5–4 regional season record. In the semi finals of the play-offs the Broncos then defeated the defending champions Zurich Renegades 29–28, followed by a narrow 2-point Swiss Bowl victory over the Basel Gladiators. What followed was another drop to Nationalliga B after the 2005 season, caused mainly by the loss of quality players. The Broncos played at this level for two seasons before returning to the top level for 2008.

Unbeaten Streak Begins
Back at Nationalliga A in 2008, the Broncos made another Swiss Bowl appearance, losing 52–27 to the Zurich Renegades. It was to be the club's last game as Landquard Broncos, being renamed Calanda Broncos shortly after. With the new name the Broncos became much more successful, becoming the first club in Switzerland to win five consecutive Swiss Bowls, from 2009 to 2013. In the 2009 Swiss Bowl, the Broncos defeated the Zurich Renegades 35–23 while the following four finals were won against the Basel Gladiators on each occasion. The 2013 final was the closest of those four encounters, with the Broncos winning 46–41. The dominance of the Broncos since 2009 manifests itself in the fact that the club has not lost a league or play-off game in Switzerland since 14 June 2009, when the Bern Grizzlies beat the Broncos 24–21 at Bern in the regular season. From that point, the Broncos went unbeaten in the Swiss league over the next four seasons.

Eurobowl Champions
Apart from national league success the club also became the first ever Swiss side to win the EFAF Cup in 2010, and the European championship Eurobowl, when the Broncos defeated favorite from the Austrian Football League, the Vienna Vikings 27–14 in the 2012 final.

In 2014, the club took part in a new European competition, the BIG6 European Football League, which consisted of three teams from Germany, two from Austria and one from Switzerland, the clubs being Berlin Adler, New Yorker Lions, Dresden Monarchs, Raiffeisen Vikings Vienna, Swarco Raiders Tirol and the Calanda Broncos. The two best teams of this competition advanced to the Eurobowl XXVIII.

League Unbeaten Streak Ends
Calandas unbeaten run in Switzerland, ended on 21 April 2014 when the team lost to the Bern Grizzlies. The Grizzlies were also the last team to beat the Broncos before the streak began in June 2009.
The club finished second in the 2014 Swiss league regular season but lost the Swiss Bowl to the Basel Gladiators. 

The Broncos embarked on a new philosophy in 2015, reducing its reliance on import foreign players and focusing more on building on local players.  Most of the league predicted a steep fall, but the Broncos surprised everyone in 2015 going 11-1 and dominating the Bern Grizzlies in the Swiss Bowl, 49-21. 

The 2016 season saw another very strong season, as the Broncos scheduled two international friendly games on top of the Swiss season.  The Broncos travelled to Poland to take on the Wroclaw Panthers, losing 35-27.  The Panthers went on to win the Polish championship and the IFAF-Europe Champions League.  Calanda also hosted GFL-playoff team Allgäu Comets, losing a 24–14 game that was tied at halftime.  The Broncos again posted a 9-1 regular season in the Swiss League and reached the Swiss Bowl for a rematch with the Bern Grizzlies.  The Grizzlies forced a last-minute turnover and won 42-35.

Return to Dominance
2017 saw a return to dominance as the Broncos continued to watch adult rookie players and young players developed in the youth program fill in their roster.  The Broncos opened the season with a pre-season game against the GFL's Stuttgart Scorpions, leading 20–3 at halftime en route to a 26–24 victory.  From there, the Broncos posted their 3rd straight 9–1 regular season and reached another Swiss Bowl.  This time, the Basel Gladiators were the opponent, but it was no contest as the Broncos steamrolled Basel to win the Swiss Bowl 42–6.  This Swiss Bowl was special as it was played in the Broncos home stadium of Ringstrasse for the 1st time since 1999.  It marked the 8th Swiss Championship in club history, most of any team in Switzerland. The Broncos have also won the Swiss Champion title in 2018. 2019 and 2021 for a total of 11 times as league champion.

Honours
 Eurobowl
 Champions: 2012
 EFAF Cup:
 Champions: 2010
 Swiss Bowl
 Champions: (11) 2003, 2009–2013, 2015, 2017–2019, 2021
 Runners-up: (5) 1998, 1999, 2008, 2014, 2016

Recent seasons
Recent seasons of the club:

 SF = Semi finals.
 SB = Swiss Bowl.

References

External links
 Official website  
 Football History  Historic American football tables from Germany and Europe

American football teams in Switzerland
American football teams established in 1991
1991 establishments in Switzerland
Grisons